Comedy Express is an Indian comedy series created by Shashikant Bhalekar and Dnyanesh Bhalekar along with Yash Entertainment, which aired on ETV Marathi from 12 June 2008 till date. The series revolves around a group of characters who play short skits with characters of varied class and genre often having comedy and sarcasm as its theme. The series was produced by Shashikant Bhalekar, in association with Yash Entertainment. The original executive producers is Ganesh Sagade.

Characters
 Amruta Khanvilkar - Marathi actress is anchoring the show right from first episode.
 Sunil Tawade - Actor in Marathi television plays characters like "Kavi", "Jahapanah" and "Visarbhole".
 Arun Kadam - He performs in Agri languages.
 Abhijeet Chavan - Plays character "Master" and more. His lines are "Benchvar…. Bench var ubha Karen".
 Ashish Pawar - Actor who plays naughty school boy "Bandu" and "Mr.Haa" in Comedy Express. Also plays many characters.
 Bhushan Kadu - Worked in plays like "Janun Bujun", "Ek Daav Bhatacha", and "Bhatachi Bipass". Plays "Moru" and "Salim" and other characters.
 Kamlakar Satpute - Plays characters like "Mr.Popat Bane, Inspector Kavi" whose tag line is "Eke divshi kai Jhale". Also plays "Songadya" and other characters.
 Suhas Paranjape - Actress played various roles in plays like "Tumcha Mulaga Karto Kai", "Celebretion". Also plays "Chingi" and other characters in Comedy Express.
 Meghana Erande - Actress who is a voice artist, who plays roles like "Anarkali", "Varsha" and other.
 Santosh Mayekar - Performs in play "Vastraharan".
 Ananda Karekar - Plays character "Besurkumar".
 Nirmala Kotnis - Plays character "Bhavna Chalavte".
 Pradip Patwardhan - Played roles in plays like "Moruchi Mavshi", "Baiko Asun Shejari", and "Chal Kahitraich Kai".

Awards
 Mata Sanman award, 2009 for 'Best Non-fictional Serial'
 Sanskruti Kala Darpan Award, 2010 for 'Best Comedy Serial'
 Sanskruti Kala Darpan Award, 2010 for 'Best Director' - Dnyanesh Bhalekar
 Sanskruti Kala Darpan Award, 2010 for 'Best Actor' - Bhushan Kadu

References

Indian comedy television series
Colors Marathi original programming
Marathi-language television shows